The Buttercup Chain is a 1967 novel by the British writer Janice Elliott.

Film adaptation
In 1970 it was made into a film of the same title produced by Columbia Pictures. Directed by Robert Ellis Miller, it starred Hywel Bennett, Leigh Taylor-Young and Jane Asher.

References

Bibliography
 Goble, Alan. The Complete Index to Literary Sources in Film. Walter de Gruyter, 1999.
 Todd, Janet. British Women Writers: A Critical Reference Guide. Continuum, 1989.

1967 British novels
British novels adapted into films
Novels by Janice Elliott
Secker & Warburg books